Filip Stojković (born 22 January 1993) is a professional footballer who plays as a right-back for the Austrian Bundesliga club LASK. Born in Serbia, Stojković represented the Montenegro national team.

Club career

Early career
Born in Ćuprija, Stojković grown up in Ražanj, where he started playing football with the local football club Bukovik. Later he moved to Red Star Belgrade youth academy, and signed his first professional contract with the club in June 2009, on a three-year deal. He spent the next two seasons on loan at FK Sopot, playing regularly in the Serbian League Belgrade. In 2011, Stojković returned to his parent club and made his Serbian SuperLiga debut in a 4–0 home win over Smederevo in March 2012. He also recorded three appearances in the Serbian Cup, as they won the trophy. During the 2012–13 season, Stojković played on loan at Banat Zrenjanin and subsequently for Čukarički.

Čukarički
After transferring to Čukarički, Stojković established himself as a regular starter, helping them win the Serbian Cup in the 2014–15 season. He was also named in the Serbian SuperLiga Team of the Season in 2015 and 2016. In his last season at Čukarički, Stojković made six assists over 34 games played.

1860 Munich
In July 2016, Stojković signed a three-year contract with German club 1860 Munich. The transfer was approximately €750,000, and the coach at the time was Kosta Runjaić. The team at the time included one of Stojković's teammates from Montenegro's national selection, Stefan Mugoša. In spite of coming to Munich injured, Stojković initially saw playing time, but fell out of rhythm after a coaching change. After the club was relegated from the 2. Bundesliga, Stojković left as a free agent in 2017.

Red Star Belgrade
On 12 June 2017, Stojković rejoined his home club Red Star Belgrade on a two-year deal. On 18 December 2018, Stojković signed a contract extension with Red Star to the summer of 2022.

Rapid Wien
On 30 August 2019, Stojković signed for Rapid Wien for an undisclosed fee believed to be in the region of €300,000. He signed a contract until 2022. However, he was sacked by the club officials after he reported an injury so he can go and watch the Serbian Cup final between his beloved Red Star and Partizan.

LASK
Stojković signed for LASK in summer 2022.

International career
Stojković represented Serbia at the 2012 UEFA European Under-19 Championship. He was also a member of the Serbia U21s at the 2015 UEFA European Under-21 Championship.

In May 2016, Stojković was called up to the Montenegro national team by coach Ljubiša Tumbaković.  Despite being called up in June 2019, Stojković (along with Mirko Ivanić and Serbian manager Tumbaković) refused to play for the national team against Kosovo. Tumbaković was sacked for his actions the next day. Stojković has earned a total of 15 caps, scoring no goals. His final international was a March 2019 European Championship qualification match against England.

Career statistics

Club

International

Honours
Red Star Belgrade
 Serbian SuperLiga: 2017–18, 2018–19
 Serbian Cup: 2011–12

Čukarički
 Serbian Cup: 2014–15

Individual
 Serbian SuperLiga Team of the Season: 2014–15, 2015–16, 2017–18, 2018–19

Notes

References

External links
 Filip Stojković stats at utakmica.rs 
 
 
 
 

1993 births
Living people
People from Ćuprija
Serbian people of Montenegrin descent
Association football fullbacks
Serbian footballers
Serbia youth international footballers
Serbia under-21 international footballers
Montenegrin footballers
Montenegro international footballers
Red Star Belgrade footballers
FK Sopot players
FK Banat Zrenjanin players
FK Čukarički players
TSV 1860 Munich players
SK Rapid Wien players
LASK players
Serbian SuperLiga players
Serbian First League players
2. Bundesliga players
Austrian Football Bundesliga players
Montenegrin expatriate footballers
Expatriate footballers in Germany
Montenegrin expatriate sportspeople in Germany
Expatriate footballers in Austria
Montenegrin expatriate sportspeople in Austria